Leslie Butkiewicz (born 26 May 1982) is a former tennis player from Belgium.

Biography
Butkiewicz, a right-handed player, won nine singles and 15 doubles titles on the ITF Circuit.

She also featured in the main draw of the doubles at several WTA Tour events, including five appearances at her home tournament in Antwerp.

Both of the Fed Cup ties she played in for Belgium came against the United States. In 2005, she lost a dead rubber singles match to Venus Williams in the quarterfinals of the World Group. The following year, she partnered Caroline Maes in the doubles of the World Group semifinal against the United States, which was also a dead rubber. She was a member of the Belgian squad that lost the 2006 World Group final to Italy, but was unused.

ITF Circuit finals

Singles: 10 (9–1)

Doubles: 30 (15–15)

References

External links
 
 
 

1982 births
Living people
Belgian female tennis players
Sportspeople from Antwerp
21st-century Belgian women